After Yesterday is the seventh studio album by folk singer-songwriter John Gorka. It was released on October 20, 1998, by Red House Records.  The album marked Gorka's return to Red House, after five albums with Windham Hill/High Street Records.  This was heralded as a homecoming-of-sorts as Red House had issued Gorka's debut, I Know in 1987.  The album also marks several changes in the life of the artist himself.  Themes of parenting and family life first heard here on songs such as, "When He Cries" and "Cypress Trees" have now become a regular feature of Gorka's subsequent albums.

The album was well received by both reviewers and folk music radio DJs.  The album debuted at number two on the Folk Music Radio Airplay Chart for October and held the number one position in November 1998.

Songs

"Heroes" 
"Heroes" was actually written by Gorka sometime in the 1980s.  Gorka's copy of the lyrics were stolen, however, and the song was forgotten until Gorka relearned it from Hugh Blumenfeld a decade later.  Blumenfeld tells this story:
I learned 'Heroes' from John in Kerrville – I think it was 1987. He was camped next to my wife Andrea and me in an enclave that had been dubbed 'Little New York.' I forget when we first heard the song, whether it was there or earlier in NYC, but it was at Andrea's request that I learned it. The song was brand new and we both loved it as soon as we heard it, but Andrea was the one who wanted to sing it. So, one bright midmorning when things in the campgrounds are lazy and slow, John passed over his notebook and I copied out the words. Soon afterwards, the notebook – along with his guitar – was stolen from his car and never recovered.
Andrea and I sang it at home from time to time during the next ten years – our own private little treasure. It never occurred to either of us to ask John about it, until I opened for him at Godfreys in 1997. It was only then I learned that the song had been lost in the notebook and that he'd forgotten it long ago. So I was able to play it for him downstairs in the dressing room before the gig and write him out a copy of his own lyric.

Track listing 
All songs written by John Gorka except where noted

 "When the Ice Goes Out" – 4:51
 "Thorny Patch" – 5:22
 "Cypress Trees" – 3:12
 "Wisdom" – 5:34
 "Silvertown" – 4:31
 "January Floor" (Cass Gorka, John Gorka) – 4:00
 "Amber Lee" – 4:30
 "After Yesterday" – 2:28
 "When He Cries" – 1:24
 "St. Caffeine" – 3:27
 "Zuly" – 4:46
 "Heroes" – 4:36

Personnel 

 Linda Beauvais – Artwork, Design
 David Glasser – Mastering
 John Gorka Banjo, – Guitar, Vocals, producer
 Peter Horvath –  Engineer, Original Production Assistance
 John Jennings – Acoustic and electric guitar, Percussion, Drums, Keyboards, producer, Upright bass
 Lucy Kaplansky – Vocals
 Jed Luhmann – Engineer
 Dean Magraw – Acoustic guitar
 Michael Manring – Bass
 Ann Marsden – Artwork, Design, Photography
 Peter Ostroushko – Fiddle, Mandolin
 Andy Stochansky – Percussion, Drums, Original Production Assistance
 Tommy Tucker – Engineer
 Shane Washington – Mixing

Notes and sources

External links 
 After Yesterday, lyrics and samples from official John Gorka web site
 After Yesterday page from Red House Records
 [ After Yesterday] entry at the Allmusic
 An interview with John Gorka from Bodles Opera House in Chester, New York, on September 17, 1999, by Angela Page, Folk Plus, WJFF-FM, airdate: September 18, 1999

John Gorka albums
1998 albums
Red House Records albums